Parkwood is a suburb of Randburg, South Africa. It is located in Region E of the City of Johannesburg Metropolitan Municipality.

References 

Johannesburg Region E